Muthupet Dargah is the popular name for Sheik Dawood Kamlil Valyullah Dargah in the town of Muthupet in the Tiruvarur District of Tamil Nadu, India. The dargah is believed to be over 1000 years old and one of the oldest Muslim structures in the Indian subcontinent.

External links 

Islam in Tamil Nadu
Dargahs in India
Tiruvarur district